Calaway is a surname of English and French origin. Notable people with the surname include:

James C. Calaway, American businessman
Mark Calaway (born 1965), American professional wrestler who performs for WWE under the ring name The Undertaker
Paul K. Calaway (1910–1993), American chemical engineer

See also
Calaway Park, a Canadian amusement park
Callaway (surname)